Bloomington High School (BHS) is a public secondary school in Bloomington, Illinois, and is part of Bloomington School District 87.

Curriculum 
Courses include subjects of standard core high school curricula (Math, English, Science, Physical Education, Foreign Language, etc.) as well as courses in fine arts, vocational skills and special education.

Athletics
Athletics include a full range of individual and team sports, including football, basketball, baseball, softball, soccer, volleyball, tennis, swimming, diving, wrestling, track and field, cross country, golf, cheerleading, gaming club, and pom pons. A wide variety of school clubs also meet on various topics.

The school's colors are purple and gold. The school dropped its mascot, a Native American chief head, in 2001 because it was deemed offensive. The school's students at that time voted not to replace the mascot but still called the Purple Raiders. Bloomington High School participates in the Big 12 Conference (Illinois).

Awards
Bloomington High School was named by U.S. News & World Report as a Bronze Medal Winner in 2009 and a Silver Medal Winner in 2012, reflecting its status as one of the nation's best high schools.

Notable alumni
Gordon William Lillie a.k.a. Pawnee Bill, worked for Buffalo Bill's Wild West Show, then later operated his own wild west show
Sidney Smith (1890s) Syndicated cartoonist
A.C. Littleton (1908?) – Professor and accounting historian University of Illinois (now Gies College of Business), editor-in-chief The Accounting Review, Accounting Hall of Fame inductee
Curt Raydon (1952?) — Former MLB player (Pittsburgh Pirates)
Jim Cox (1968) — Former MLB player (Montreal Expos)
Edward B. Rust Jr. (1968) — CEO, State Farm
Bob Bender (1975) — basketball coach and player: Currently working as an assistant with the NBA's Atlanta Hawks.
Tim Bradstreet (1985) — Comic book artist and illustrator
Brandon Hughes (2004) — Philadelphia Eagles football player
 Clinton Davisson, recipient of the 1937 Nobel Prize in Physics.
 Greg Engel, NFL player

References

External links
School website
IHSA school competition website

Public high schools in Illinois
Schools in Bloomington–Normal